Miyan Deh Rural District is a rural district (dehestan) in Shibkaveh District, Fasa County, Fars Province, Iran. At the 2006 census, its population was 10,898, in 2,418 families.  The rural district has 36 villages.

References 

Rural Districts of Fars Province
Fasa County